Darvan (also Romanized as Darvān) is a village in Kamalabad Rural District, in the Central District of Karaj County, Alborz Province, Iran. At the 2006 census, its population was 99, in 37 families.

References 

Populated places in Karaj County